Bear Valley is an unincorporated community in the town of Ithaca, Richland County, Wisconsin, United States. The area was played by Peter Haskin in 1855, and when a post office opened at the site, it was named Bear Valley for two nearby geographic features: Bear Creek and a nineteen mile long valley.

Notes

Unincorporated communities in Richland County, Wisconsin
Unincorporated communities in Wisconsin